Danil Andreyevich Stepanov (born 25 January 2000) is a Russian football player who plays as a left-back for FC Arsenal Tula.

Club career
He made his debut in the Russian Premier League for FC Rubin Kazan on 9 December 2018 in a game against FC Zenit Saint Petersburg, as a 63rd-minute substitute for Rail Abdullin.

On 17 July 2020, he joined FC Rotor Volgograd on loan for the 2020–21 season.

On 29 May 2021, he was loaned to FC Arsenal Tula for the 2021–22 season, with an option to purchase. On 29 December 2021, Arsenal exercised the purchase option and signed a long-term contract with Stepanov.

Career statistics

References

External links
 
 

2000 births
Footballers from Kazan
Living people
Russian footballers
Russia youth international footballers
Russia under-21 international footballers
Association football defenders
FC Rubin Kazan players
FC Rotor Volgograd players
FC Arsenal Tula players
Russian Premier League players
Russian First League players